Daddy's Home is the sixth studio album by American musician St. Vincent, released on May 14, 2021 by Loma Vista Recordings. Like its predecessor, Masseduction (2017), Annie Clark produced the album alongside Jack Antonoff. Daddy's Home was inspired by Clark's father's release from prison at the end of 2019, as well as the musical palette of New York City in the first half of the 1970s. The record musically incorporates lounge-pop and psychedelic music. The album won the award for Best Alternative Music Album at the 64th Annual Grammy Awards.

Background 
In May 2010, Clark's father, Richard Clark was convicted on of one count of conspiracy, seven counts of wire fraud, five counts of securities fraud, and one count of money laundering. During his incarceration, Clark released four albums: Strange Mercy (2011), St. Vincent (2014) and Masseduction (2017), receiving a growing amount of attention with each album. After his release in 2019, Clark was inspired to write the album's title track and also found inspiration in music made in New York City from 1971 to 1975, a contrast to her previous albums, which were categorized as indie rock.

On December 15, 2020, Clark revealed that she would be releasing her sixth studio album in 2021. On February 25, 2021, street posters revealed that the album would be released on May 14, 2021. Clark released the album's lead single, "Pay Your Way in Pain", on March 5, 2021. In a profile with The Forty-Five following the single's release, she stated that the theme of the album would be her father's release from prison. Clark added that she wanted to narrate her "story", opining that his release from prison was "a good starting point".

Critical reception 

Upon release, Daddy's Home received widespread critical acclaim. On the review aggregation website Metacritic, it received an average score of 85 out of 100 based on 29 reviews, indicating "universal acclaim". AnyDecentMusic? collated reviews giving the album an average score of 8.2 out of 10 based on 32 reviews.

Rolling Stone called it "a mutant strain of retro pop steeped in New York lore", and Tom Doyle of Mojo hailed it as "a full conceptual realisation, filled with great melodies, deep grooves, colourful characterisations and sonic detail that reveals itself over repeated plays."

Accolades

Daddy's Home Tour
The Daddy's Home Tour is a concert tour by American singer St. Vincent in support of her sixth album, Daddy's Home. The tour visited North America, Europe and Asia between 2021 and 2022.

The following setlist was obtained from the concert held at Central Park in Atlanta on October 22, 2021, as part of the Shaky Knees Music Festival. It does not represent all concerts for the duration of the tour.

"Digital Witness"
"Down"
"Birth in Reverse"
"Daddy's Home"
"New York"
"Los Ageless"
"Sugarboy"
"Fast Slow Disco"
"Pay Your Way in Pain"
"Fear the Future"
"Your Lips Are Red"
"The Melting of the Sun"

Track listing
All songs written by Annie Clark, except where noted. All songs produced by Clark and Jack Antonoff.

 Daddy's Home

Personnel

Musicians
 Annie Clark – vocals (1–8, 10–13), guitar (1-8, 10–13), sitar guitar (1, 2, 4–8), modular synthesizer (1), acoustic guitar (2–5, 8, 10–12), lap steel (2, 5, 7), bass (2, 12), Wurlitzer (4), keyboards (7), Mellotron (7, 10), vibes (7)
 Jack Antonoff – drums (1–8, 10–13), percussion (1, 5, 8), bass (1–8, 11–13), Wurlitzer (1–4, 6–8, 10–12), guitar (1, 4, 13), background vocals (1), synthesizers (3), Mellotron (4, 10, 13), piano (5), clavinet (5, 12), clavichord (8), acoustic guitar (12)
 Thomas Bartlett – piano (1, 10), Wurlitzer (2–5, 8, 13)
 Cian Riordan – drums (1, 5)
 Lynne Fiddmont – background vocals (1–8, 10–13)
 Kenya Hathaway – background vocals (1–8, 10–13)
 Evan Smith – saxophones (2, 3, 10, 12), flute (2, 10), guitar (2), synthesizers (2), clarinet (10), horns (11)
 Sam KS – drums (2, 10), congas (2)
 Patrick Kelly – bass (10)
 Greg Leisz – pedal steel (10)
 Daniel Hart – violin (10)
 Michael Leonhard – trombone (12), trumpet (12)

Producers and engineers
 Annie Clark – producer
 Jack Antonoff – producer
 Laura Sisk – recording engineer
 Peter Labberton – recording engineer (10)
 John Rooney – assistant recording engineer
 Jon Sher – assistant recording engineer
 Cian Riordan – additional recording, mixer
 Chris Gehringer – mastering engineer

Artwork
 Zackery Michael – photography
 Mishka Westell – package design
 Annie Clark – art direction, creative direction
 Leah Lehrer – art direction, creative direction
 Liz Lambert – art direction
 Avigail Collins – styling
 Pamela Neal – hair
 Hinako Nishiguch – makeup

Charts

References

External links

2021 albums
Albums produced by Jack Antonoff
Albums produced by St. Vincent (musician)
Loma Vista Recordings albums
St. Vincent (musician) albums
Grammy Award for Best Alternative Music Album